Xinhua Township is a township of Liuzhi Special District, Liupanshui, Guizhou, People's Republic of China, located more than  south-southeast of downtown as the crow flies. , it has one residential community and nine villages under its administration.

References 

Township-level divisions of Guizhou